Gunnar Vada (16 March 1927 in Beitstad – 14 June 2018 in Beitstad) was a Norwegian politician for the Conservative Party.

He was elected to the Norwegian Parliament from Nord-Trøndelag in 1977, and was re-elected on one occasion. He served as a deputy representative during the terms 1973–1977 and 1985–1989. From 1985 to 1986 he met as a regular representative, filling in for Wenche Frogn Sellæg who was appointed to the second cabinet Willoch.

On the local level he was a member of Nord-Trøndelag county council from 1975 to 1979. He chaired the local party chapter from 1972 to 1974, and was deputy leader of the county chapter from 1970 to 1975.

References

1927 births
2018 deaths
Members of the Storting
Politicians from Nord-Trøndelag
Conservative Party (Norway) politicians
People from Steinkjer
Norwegian College of Agriculture alumni
20th-century Norwegian politicians